The Polish rabbit is compact breed of domestic rabbit, most often bred by fanciers (as opposed to hobbyists) and commonly exhibited in rabbit shows. Despite its name, the Polish rabbit likely originated in England, not Poland. The breed known in the UK as Polish is the breed known in the US as Britannia Petite. The breed known in the US as Polish is unknown in the UK.

Appearance

Today, the Polish rabbit in the US is used as a fancy exhibition breed and as a pet.  Polish rabbits are small, with short ears that touch each other all the way from the base to the tip.  This breed has a short head with full cheeks and bold eyes. Due to its small size, the Polish rabbit is often confused with the Netherland Dwarf, although the Polish is a little larger and its head is not rounded.  There are many other differences between the two breeds, such as coat structure, body type and colors. The accepted weight a 6-months-or-older Polish rabbit in the US is 2½ to 3½ pounds, with the ideal weight being 2½ pounds.

Until the 1950s, most Polish rabbits in the US were white with either red eyes or blue eyes. The ruby-eyed white is a true albino. The blue-eyed white has the Vienna breed's white gene and is not a true albino. Since the 1950s, colored Polish varieties have been recognized by rabbit clubs. In 1957, the American Rabbit Breeders' Association recognized a black as well as a chocolate color in Polish rabbits. In 1982, the blue variety was recognized, and in 1998 the broken variety was approved.

Personality and care

Despite their small size, Polish rabbits need space in cage and barn facilities. They need to be out about 5–6 hours a day. Cage bottoms should not be slippery, as this can cause hip injuries and splay leg.

The American Polish rabbit is generally calm and friendly, especially the bucks. The does can be territorial if not spayed.  Children should always be supervised when handling rabbits, to ensure that the rabbit is not inadvertently injured.

Rabbits can be easily trained to use a litter box and to accept a harness with leash when out of their cage. Rabbit-proofing a room where a rabbit is roaming freely is critical. Rabbits will chew on carpets, baseboard and especially electrical cords.

Feeding
Polish rabbits should be fed about 1/4 cups of pelleted feed every other day depending on the activity level of the rabbit.

It is vital that rabbits have access to unlimited fresh hay to ensure good dental health, gastrointestinal health, urinary tract health, weight control and for environmental enrichment.

Treats such as fruit and carrot should be fed sparingly; typically a portion no larger than the tip of the thumb. Carrots are high in sugar so best to avoid it. Fresh young dandelion leaves, parsley and spinach are nutritious choices for treats. Vegetables in the cabbage family and high-sugar foods such as corn should be avoided, as these can cause gastroenteritis. Seed should never be given to rabbits. Iceberg lettuce has no nutritional value. Remember the darker the lettuce the healthier.

A healthy rabbit should be well fleshed but not flabby. This is tested by running one's hand over the rabbits back. A firm layer of flesh over the ribs and spine together with the ribs and spine should be felt, indicating proper nutrition. A prominent spine indicates under nutrition and is corrected by increasing the feed. Inability to feel the spine indicates over nutrition and likewise, the amount of feed is decreased.

Health concerns
As with other rabbits, Polish rabbits do not do well in high temperatures, but can withstand low temperatures if they are kept dry and out of drafts. They are prone to hairball obstructions and matted coats if not cared for properly. Other health concerns include ear mites, Pasturella, respiratory disease, dental problems, urinary bladder stones and fractured backs. Be quick to notice any changes in diet or litter box habits and contact a rabbit veterinarian immediately.

The average life span of a breeding Polish rabbit is 5 to 6 years and 8–10 with being spayed or neutered.

See also

Rabbit
Domestic rabbit
List of rabbit breeds

References

Further reading

External links
American Rabbit Breeder's Association
Polish Rabbit Breed History
Breeds of Rabbits Chart

Rabbit breeds
Rabbits as pets
Rabbit breeds originating in England